Qufu East railway station is a high-speed railway station in Qufu, Jining, Shandong, China. It is served by the Beijing–Shanghai high-speed railway.

Although located within the Qufu county-level city, the station is quite a distance to the south-east from Qufu's urban area. The city centre can be reached with the K01 bus, from which the older Qufu railway station, serving local and slower trains, can be reached with city bus number 5.

Service
As of January 2012, about 20 pairs of G- and D-series fast trains stop at Qufu East every day. Most of them have Beijing or Shanghai, or one of the intermediate cities (Tianjin, Jinan, Xuzhou), as the destination. A few direct D trains continue to points outside of the main Beijing-Shanghai corridor, namely Zhengzhou, Qingdao, and Hangzhou, and Fuzhou.

Notes

Railway stations in Shandong
Railway stations in China opened in 2011
Railway stations in Jining